Dharmapuri is a Lok Sabha constituency in Tamil Nadu, India. Its Tamil Nadu Parliamentary Constituency number is 10 of 39.

Assembly segments

2009-present

Before 2009 
Harur (SC)
Morappur
Dharmapuri
Pennagaram
Mettur
Taramangalam

Members of the Parliament

Election results

General Election 2019

General Election 2014

General Election 2009

General Election 2004

See also
 Dharmapuri
 List of Constituencies of the Lok Sabha

References

 Election Commission of India https://web.archive.org/web/20081218010942/http://www.eci.gov.in/StatisticalReports/ElectionStatistics.asp

External links
Dharmapuri lok sabha constituency election 2019 date and schedule

Lok Sabha constituencies in Tamil Nadu
Dharmapuri district